The University Scholars Program is an educational program for gifted students. It is part of the Pennsylvania Leadership Charter School, both of which are located in West Chester, Pennsylvania.

From the University Scholars Website: 
The University Scholars Program is a bricks-and-cyber blended program offering a specialized gifted education curriculum. The program is designed to maximize the intellectual potential for gifted and motivated learners in a small learning community where individual achievement is valued and supported.

External links
Pennsylvania Leadership Charter School
University Scholars Program

Public high schools in Pennsylvania
Gifted education
Charter schools in Pennsylvania